Domenico de' Marini (died 1635) was a Roman Catholic prelate who served as Titular Patriarch of Jerusalem (1627–1635),
Archbishop of Genoa (1616–1635),
and Bishop of Albenga (1611–1616).

Biography
On 11 April 1611, Domenico de' Marini was appointed during the papacy of Pope Paul V as Bishop of Albenga.
On 1 May 1611, he was consecrated bishop by Marcello Crescenzi (bishop), Bishop of Assisi, with Virgilio Fiorenzi, Bishop of Nocera Umbra, and Luca Semproni, Bishop of Città di Castello, serving as co-consecrators. 
On 18 July 1616, he was appointed during the papacy of Pope Paul V as Archbishop of Genoa.
On 15 November 1627, he was appointed during the papacy of Pope Urban VIII as Titular Patriarch of Jerusalem.
He served as Titular Patriarch of Jerusalem until his death in February 1635.

While bishop, he was the principal consecrator of Giovanni Domenico Spinola, Archbishop of Acerenza e Matera (1630).

References

External links and additional sources
 (for Chronology of Bishops) 
 (for Chronology of Bishops) 
 (for Chronology of Bishops) 
 (for Chronology of Bishops) 
 (for Chronology of Bishops) 
 (for Chronology of Bishops) 

17th-century Italian Roman Catholic archbishops
Bishops appointed by Pope Paul V
Bishops appointed by Pope Urban VIII
1635 deaths
Roman Catholic archbishops of Genoa